Mount Aldrich is a massive, somewhat flat-topped mountain standing at the east side of Ragotzkie Glacier in Britannia Range. Discovered by the Discovery expedition (1901–04) and named for Admiral Pelham Aldrich, who gave assistance to Scott in preparing the expedition.

Mountains of Oates Land
Britannia Range (Antarctica)